Forget and Not Slow Down is the sixth studio album by American rock band Relient K, released on October 6, 2009. It is the band's first album to feature Ethan Luck on drums, replacing longtime drummer Dave Douglas. The album is also the first Relient K album with Mono Vs Stereo and their first on Jive Records. The album was produced by Mark Lee Townsend and mixed by Andy Wallace.

Background and recording
In early 2009, Relient K's vocalist Matt Thiessen, secluded from the rest of the world in Winchester, Tennessee, began to write music for three months on an album to be released later in 2009. About being isolated Thiessen stated, "It was awesome. You could think about something, and keep thinking about it, and no one would interrupt you for six or seven hours. You could keep your brain on one train of thought. I’ll never want to write another record any other way." An influence for the album was the band's lead singer, Matt Thiessen, and his fiancee, Shannon, breaking up in late 2008.

Thiessen stated that they were keen on finishing the album for a 2009 release and had begun recording the new album with their "favorite" producer, Mark Lee Townsend and mixer Andy Wallace Guitarist Matt Hoopes stated about Mark Lee Townsend that, "We’ve got an almost telepathic relationship." On March 23, 2009, the band started recording at Dark Horse Recording Studio in Franklin, Tennessee, which Hoopes states is his "favorite studio". The band had used the likes of synthesizers and MIDI before; but Thiessen stated that every instrument on this album "It's organic. I know a lot of bands do that now. But for us, it was really the first time we made it the real thing." On April 30, Thiessen posted that they were "Tracking drums for the last three songs. The new album is almost done!".

On May 5, 2009 the band announced via the Air 1 website that The Almost and Relient K were in the same studio and stated the band members were swapping gear to record both band's albums. With the bands in the studio together, Aaron Gillespie would record vocals for the album which was confirmed with the release of the track listing and the guest vocalists.

Influences
Influences for the record are bands like Counting Crows and Foo Fighters. Matt Thiessen stated in an interview with Pollstar, "We definitely wanted to make a rock record. We wanted it to be uptempo and energetic. As far as the sonic aspect, we wanted to make it less modern sounding, with classic rock textures – Counting Crows, Foo Fighters, those kind of '90s albums. That was a good time for rock 'n' roll." Matt Hoopes has also stated "The songs that tend to be the fan favorites in the past are the ones about making mistakes but ultimately moving past them and this record has a lot of that feeling. No matter what trials you encounter in your life, it doesn't have to be the end of your story. You can move on and be happy and experience joy."

When Matt Thiessen sent a message to AbsolutePunk readers he stated "It's a bit weird because there are some untitled outros and intros throughout the album. Basically, if the track list skips a number, something is up. There are eleven songs, but the whole thing runs about 43 minutes." There is a hidden track before track 1. It is Thiessen's dad singing a line from Sahara.

Promotion and release
In late March 2009, it was announced that the band had completed their contract with Gotee Records and would join the Mono vs Stereo label. On May 8, Thiessen announced on his Twitter account that the new album would be called Forget and Not Slow Down, which will also be the title of a song on the album. The following day, while at Glory at the Gardens at Busch Gardens Tampa Bay, they announced that the album should be released around October. In late May and early June, the band went on tour with Owl City, Runner Runner and the Classic Crime. Following this, they went on a short Northeast and Midwestern US tour in June and July 2009. On July 9, Gotee Records announced on Twitter that Forget and Not Slow Down is to be released on October 6, 2009 and provided a flyer via TwitPic. On August 4, the announcement of the album's completion was made via Thiessen's Twitter account which simply stated "Ding! Album's done."

On August 20, the track listing and cover art were released to AbsolutePunk.net, in addition to the information that the first single is the title track, and that it in fact had already been released to some Christian radio stations. When Thiessen released the track listing, he announced that the missing numbers on the track list are interludes. The interlude titles were posted on Gotee Records' pre-release page for the album. The cover art is an oil painting on canvas, by Linden Frederick, Matt Thiessen's uncle. On September 17, 2009, "Forget and Not Slow Down" was posted online. "Therapy" was posted online on October1, before it was released to Hot Adult Contemporary radio stations on October 19. Four webisodes were released weekly via the band's MySpace and Facebook pages, showing the recording progress in the studio. The album has also been released on vinyl record (pressed at United Record Pressing in Nashville, TN). The vinyl record itself was for sale on their tour with Paramore and fun. and is now offered on their webstore as a bundle package with a carrier bag and wooden case. In November and December 2009, the band went on a US tour with TobyMac. In April and May 2010, the band supported Paramore on their headlining US tour; the trek included an appearance at The Bamboozle festival.

Reception

The album debuted at No. 15 on the Billboard 200, No. 1 in Christian Albums, No. 2 in Digital Albums, No. 4 in Alternative Albums and No. 5 in Rock Albums.

In 2010, the album was nominated for a Dove Award for Recorded Music Packaging of the Year at the 41st GMA Dove Awards.

Track listing

Personnel 
Relient K
 Matthew Thiessen – vocals, acoustic piano, Rhodes piano, Wurlitzer electric piano, organ, electric guitar, nylon string guitar, trombone, steel drums, bells
 Matt Hoopes – acoustic guitar, electric guitar, Omnichord, backing vocals (11)
 Jon Schneck – electric guitar
 John Warne – bass, backing vocals
 Ethan Luck – electric guitar, drums, percussion, backing vocals (7)

Additional personnel
 Mark Lee Townsend – electric guitar, mandolin
 Christi Bissell – baritone saxophone (8), bassoon (8), clarinet (8)
 Laura Musten – strings (2, 14)
 Buffy Woessner – strings (2, 14)
 Chris Carmichael – strings (11, 14)
 Tim Skipper – backing vocals (1, 9)
 Brian McSweeney – backing vocals (7)
 Aaron Gillespie – backing vocals (9)
 Matt MacDonald – backing vocals (9, 13)
 Arnold Thiessen – backing vocals (9, 11)
 Jonathan Thiessen – backing vocals (11)

Production 
 Matt Hoopes – executive producer 
 Matt Thiessen – executive producer, producer, art direction 
 Kevin Spellman – executive producer, management 
 Mark Lee Townsend – producer, engineer 
 Dave Hagen – assistant engineer, editing 
 Andy Wallace – mixing at Soundtrack Studios (New York City, New York)
 Paul Suarez – mix assistant 
 Sara Marienthal – A&R coordinator
 Mike Condo – production coordinator 
 David Baysinger – art direction, design, layout 
 Linden Frederick – art direction 
 Cale Glendening – photography 
 Ethan Luck – photography
 Ron Baysinger – hand writing

References

External links

 

2009 albums
Relient K albums
Gotee Records albums
Mono vs Stereo albums
Albums produced by Mark Lee Townsend